The Unnütze (also called the Unnutze) is a small mountain ridge northeast of the Achensee lake  between Achenkirch and Steinberg am Rofan in the Brandenberg Alps in the Austrian state of Tyrol.

The ridge has three summits and runs in a north to south direction. The summits are the Hinterunnütz (2,007 m), the Hochunnütz (2,075 m) and the Vorderunnütz (2,078 m). In general, however, the Vorderunnütz is called the Unnütz.

External links 

 tour description (snowshoe tour) 

Mountains of the Alps
Mountains of Tyrol (state)
Two-thousanders of Austria
Brandenberg Alps